Explicate can refer to:
 Explication, in analytic philosophy and literary theory, the "unfolding" and "making clear" the meaning of things
 Explicature, what is explicitly said with an utterance, often supplemented with contextual information
 Explicate order, a concept in quantum theory